Sir Archibald Campbell KB (21 August 1739 – 31 March 1791) served as governor of Georgia, Jamaica, and Madras. He was a major Scottish landowner, Heritable Usher of the White Rod for Scotland and politician who sat in the House of Commons between 1774 and 1791.

Birth
Archibald was baptized 24 August 1739 at Inveraray, Scotland. He was the second son of James Campbell (1706–1760) 3rd of Tuerechan (8th Chief of Tearlach, descended from Clan Campbell of Craignish), Commissary of the Western Isles of Scotland, and Elizabeth (died 1790), daughter of James Fisher, Provost of Inveraray. He grew up with his family at Dunderave Castle, and enjoyed the patronage of both Archibald Campbell, 3rd Duke of Argyll and Henry Dundas, 1st Viscount Melville.

Early career

Educated at Glasgow University, and afterwards at the Royal Military Academy, Woolwich. In 1758, he was commissioned into the Royal Engineers. He served with them in the Seven Years' War and was wounded at the Siege of Quebec. He participated in a number of raids along the coast of France, as well as in expeditions in the West Indies. A decade later, in 1768, Colonel Campbell, was made chief engineer of the British East India Company at Bengal, and was successfully employed by the company to head the works on Fort William in Calcutta.

In Calcutta, Campbell laid the foundation of his wealth. With Captain Henry Watson, he privately invested in a dockyard at Kidderpore, and the two men acted as contractors for building and repairing ships until the government bought their concern. He also made a fortune trading in silk. Campbell used his wealth to become a major landowner in his native Argyll. He spent over £30,000 purchasing the estates of the Island of Danna, Inverneill, Knap, Taynish, and Ulva. He also purchased the houses of Inverkeithing and Queensferry.

In 1774, after an unusually bitter electoral battle with Colonel James Masterton (1715–1777), of Newton, Colonel Archibald Campbell (now styled 'of Inverneill') became the Member of Parliament for the Stirling Burghs, aided by his guardian, Viscount Melville. James Boswell acted as Campbell's legal advisor.

Capture in America

Following his exciting electoral victory, Colonel Campbell left his elder brother, Sir James Campbell (1737–1805) of Killean, to keep his parliamentary seat warm and sailed for America in command of the 71st Regiment of Foot, Fraser's Highlanders, where the American Revolutionary War was in progress. In 1776, after a battle aboard a vessel in Boston Harbor, Campbell was captured by the Americans and held prisoner until 1778.

Campbell's capture coincided with the British capture of the American Patriot hero Ethan Allen and the American General Charles Lee. Rumours spread that they were being mistreated by the British, which had a direct effect on Campbell. In February 1777, from Concord Jail, an outraged Campbell complained to Viscount Howe of his situation. There then ensued complaints and correspondence between Howe and George Washington on Campbell's behalf.

By the following month Washington intervened and Congress protested that it had not intended to cause undue suffering to Campbell. By May, Campbell was living at the jailer's tavern, a marked improvement to his previous solitary confinement. Soon afterwards he was granted total freedom within the confine of the town of Concord, and during these years as a prisoner of war he was able to purchase the Knap estate back in Argyll. On 6 May 1778, he was finally released in exchange for Ethan Allen.

Battle of Savannah and Governor of Georgia

Six months after his release, Campbell was ordered to lead 3,000 men from New York to Georgia, and in late December his army won the Battle of Savannah, followed by another victory at Augusta. Contemporaries on both sides paid tribute to the humanity and restraint shown by Campbell. The American patriot Alexander Green, one of Lee's Legion and aide-de-camp to Major-General Nathanael Greene referred to Campbell's concern for the civil population and lack of bitterness towards his former captors. He also revealed how the Patriots feared Campbell as a commander of great ability. Greene related of Campbell:

He became provisional governor of Georgia then and named Jacques Marcus Prevost his lieutenant and successor before returning to England.

Marriage

Returning to Britain, in July 1779, he married Amelia (1755–1813), daughter of Allan Ramsay of Kinkell, Principal Painter in Ordinary to George III. Amelia Campbell's mother, Margaret (1726–1782), was the eldest daughter of Sir Alexander Lindsay of Evelick and Hon. Amelia Murray, the sister of Amelia Campbell's influential great uncle and guardian, William Murray, 1st Earl of Mansfield. Mrs Campbell was the niece of Admiral Sir John Lindsay, and by him a first cousin of Dido Elizabeth Belle.

Governor of Jamaica
He ended the American Revolution as lieutenant governor and major general in Jamaica (1779–81). At a time of great importance, Campbell (now a major-general in the army) was appointed Governor of Jamaica in 1781. The British forces in America were faring ill: the French had joined the insurgents and threatened the British West India Islands, of which they captured Tobago, St. Eustatius, St. Kitts, Nevis and Montserrat. But Campbell laid his plans so well. He was so successful in raising native troops, and was so untiring in his vigilance that the French did not dare attack Jamaica without re-inforcements.

At the same time, Campbell did what he could to assist the British troops in America by sending them information, re-inforcements and supplies. By lending some of his troops to serve as marines, he materially aided Admiral Rodney in his great victory over François Joseph Paul de Grasse at the Battle of the Saintes, saving Jamaica from a French invasion.

Campbell's wife, Amelia, and her sister, only just managed to join him in Jamaica. The crossing was perilous and their convoy came under fire from a joint French and Spanish fleet, and their ship was the only one to get through. On returning from Jamaica, Campbell was awarded as Knight of the Order of the Bath.

Governor of Madras
In India, Madras was exhausted after the war against Mysore, and no serious military operations were undertaken until renewed hostilities against that state became inevitable at the end of 1789. In 1786, Campbell, who was now a well known and highly respected figure, was appointed commander-in-chief and governor of Madras. Throughout his term of office, the country had a rest from the devastating wars, and so he devoted himself to the development of peaceful institutions.

He founded a military board which absorbed the duties of the Committee of Works; a hospital board, a board of revenue and a board of trade. He reorganized the police, established a stock exchange and a bank. He built an astronomical observatory and constituted an orphanage. In fact, there was hardly a department of the civil administration in which he did not labour to secure improvement and order. Madras sustained a serious loss when, overcome by illness, he was forced to leave India in February 1789, retiring from the post of governor in 1790.

Final years

On returning home, Campbell acquired the office of Usher of the White Rod. The Institution of Royal Engineers described Campbell as "the most brilliant of the engineers who served in India during the eighteenth century". Following a cold caught coming up from Scotland, he died the following year, 31 March 1791, at his newly purchased London home on Upper Grosvenor Street, bought from the Duke of Montrose. He was only fifty-one. His fortune, land and political titles passed to his two brothers, and his wife was given £25,000.

Campbell and his wife died without children, and they were both buried at Westminster Abbey next to Handel's Monument in Poets' Corner. A memorial by the sculptor Joseph Wilton was erected in the Abbey in 1795. Also buried in the Abbey are his nephew, Lt.-General Sir James Campbell of Inverneill and his wife's kinsmen, the Earl of Mansfield and Admiral Lindsay.

Images
He sat for thirteen sittings from January to May 1790 for a portrait by artist George Romney. Romney produced several versions of the final portrait; the principal one was bought for 70 guineas by Lady Campbell from Romney via a forwarding agent in 1791, which is now owned by the National Army Museum in London (FDA-1970-12-13) – it was until December 2008 on display as part of its permanent display on the American Revolutionary War. Three other copies are attested, one of which is now displayed in the National Gallery of Art, Washington.

See also
Carter-Campbell of Possil
Campbell of Craignish
Inverneill House

Notes

References
 Davis, Robert S., Jr, '"Portrait of a Governor", Atlanta Historical Journal, Vol XXVI, No.1, Spring 1982
 
 Archibald Campbell in the Dictionary of Canadian Biography
 thePeerage.com
New Georgia Encyclopedia

External links
 

Sir Archibald Campbell of Inverneill

1739 births
1791 deaths
People from Inveraray
British Army major generals
Royal Engineers officers
British Army personnel of the American Revolutionary War
Governors of Jamaica
Members of the Parliament of Great Britain for Scottish constituencies
British MPs 1774–1780
British MPs 1784–1790
British MPs 1790–1796
Knights Companion of the Order of the Bath
British Army personnel of the Seven Years' War
Bengal Engineers officers
71st Highlanders officers
Colonial governors of Georgia (U.S. state)
18th-century Scottish landowners
Politics of Stirling (council area)
Scottish civil servants
Scottish generals
Archibald
Burials at Westminster Abbey